Waqt Batayega Kaun Apna Kaun Paraya (English: Time will tell who is your own and who is an outsider) is a Hindi television saga that aired on Sony Entertainment Television based on the story of a girl named Rudra who faces many hurdles by her adoptive family members. The series premiered on 14 April 2008 and is produced by Dheeraj Kumar's production house Creative Eye Limited.

Plot 
The story is based on the life of an adopted girl named Rudra, who is searching for love from her stepmother and other family members. Rudra knows that she is adopted. She is very close to her father but not to other family members. She is aware of her limitations and keeping that in mind she takes care of her family members. She does not take it to heart when family members yell at her or curse her.

In reality she is the heir of the family as she is her stepfather's older brother's daughter and Nanny is her real mother. However, Nanny hides this truth as her marriage with Rudra's real father was hidden from the family because she was poor.

Cast 
 Payel Sarkar as Rudra 
 Rucha Gujarathi as Piya
 Sachin Shroff as Saurav / Joy 
 Nishigandha Wad as Sunanda 
 Mukesh Khanna as Biswajeet Raichoudhury
 Kishori Shahane as Yashomati Raichoudhury 
 Surendra Pal as Sarvadaman Raichoudhury 
 Eva Grover as Jaya 
 Gufi Paintal as Pandit Ji 
 Nayan Bhatt as Dadi 
 Rakesh Kukreti as Bankim 
 Aakansha Awasthi as Shubhangi 
 Aroop Deb as Upendra 
 Jaya Binju as Nandita 
 Pooja Pihal as Protima 
 Deepak Parashar as Basab Malhotra
 Roopa Ganguly as Madhvi Basab Malhotra 
 Madhuri Sanjeev as Taiji 
 Smriti Sinha as Mitali 
 Shriya Bisht as Anushka 
 Geeta Khanna as Mangla 
 Devi Irani as Shakuntala 
 Sameer Sharma as Dev

References

External links 
Official Site
Official Site on SET Asia

2008 Indian television series debuts
2008 Indian television series endings
Indian television soap operas
Sony Entertainment Television original programming